Snow Summit is a ski resort that was established in 1952 and is in the San Bernardino Mountains in Southern California. It is located by Big Bear Lake along with its sister resort Bear Mountain; these two resorts which operate under the same management are collectively known as Big Bear Mountain Resorts (BBMR).

Snow Summit is one of the larger ski areas in Southern California, and is considered to be one of the most popular ski and snowboard destinations for patrons from around the Los Angeles area.

In 2014, Mammoth Mountain purchased Bear Mountain and Snow Summit for $38 million. In 2017, Mammoth Resorts announced its sale by Starwood to a partnership of Aspen Skiing Company and KSL Capital Partners, known as Alterra Mountain Company.

Bear Mountain relationship 
For decades, Snow Summit and Goldmine Mountain operated independently of one another, less than two miles apart. In 1988, S.K.I.,  a major ski area operator, bought Goldmine, changed its name to Bear Mountain, and invested millions of dollars in improvements that enhanced its competitive position against Snow Summit. In 2002, Snow Summit purchased Bear Mountain, and the two became one company.

Snow Summit and Bear Mountain are marketed as areas constituent to Big Bear Mountain Resorts. A lift ticket from either area is honored at the other, and a free bus service between Snow Summit and Bear Mountain shuttles patrons back and forth between the two for that purpose.

In 2014, Snow Summit and Bear Mountain resorts were purchased by the owners of the Mammoth Mountain ski resort.

Snowmaking 
Snow Summit's extensive, multimillion-dollar snowmaking system draws water from Big Bear Lake to cover all of the resort's marked terrain with skiable artificial snow — if ambient temperature and humidity are amenable —  throughout its winter operating season .

Snow Summit trails

References

External links
Official Snow Summit website

Alterra Mountain Company
Ski areas and resorts in California
San Bernardino Mountains
San Bernardino National Forest
Sports venues in San Bernardino County, California
Companies based in San Bernardino County, California
1952 establishments in California